Badminton events for the 1975 Southeast Asian Peninsular Games were held at Thai capital of Bangkok between 9 to 16 December 1975. At the end of the competitions, Malaysia stood top by winning four gold medals while host Thailand won gold in three events.

Medal winners

Medal table

Final results

References

External links 
HISTORY OF THE SEA GAMES, olympic.org.my

1975
1975 in badminton
1975 in Thai sport
Badminton tournaments in Thailand
Sports competitions in Bangkok
Events at the 1975 Southeast Asian Peninsular Games